Greg T. Walker (born 8 July 1951) is an American bassist who played with rock band Lynyrd Skynyrd between 1971 and 1972. His main band, named Blackfoot, existed between 1969 and 1985. In 2004 a new line-up was born, with Axe frontman Bobby Barth as their singer/guitarist.

In the classic line-up of the band, he played with Rickey Medlocke as frontman, Charlie Hargrett as second guitarist, and Jakson T. Spires on drums.
Besides playing the bass, he also ensures the backing vocals together with drummer Jakson T. Spires. His backing vocals can for example be heard on their hit Train, Train from the Strikes album.

In 2014 he recorded a 5-song EP with French rock trio Lloyd Project and played a couple of concerts in Paris along with the band.

His Native American ancestry is Muscogee from the Eastern Branch of the Florida Creek Nation (pipe carrier). Greg makes his own bows and arrows and many types of traditional Native American crafts and jewelry. When not touring or recording, his time is spent on ancestral lands in Florida, where he pursues his passion of raising and riding horses.

Discography

With Blackfoot
No Reservations (1975) 
Flyin' High (1976)
Strikes (1979)
Tomcattin' (1980)
Marauder (1981)
Siogo (1983)
Vertical Smiles (1984)

With Lynyrd Skynyrd
Street Survivors (1977) (Bass on One More Time recorded during 1971-72)
Skynyrd's First and... Last (1978)

References 

American rock bass guitarists
American male bass guitarists
Lynyrd Skynyrd members
Living people
American male guitarists
Blackfoot (band) members
1951 births